Lady Anbar (lit. “Anbar”) is an Egyptian musical comedy film starring Laila Mourad and Anwar Wagdi. Alongside Wagdi and Mourad, the latter of whom sings the signature number, "اللي يقدر على قلبي" (“Who Can Hold My Heart?”), the movie stars Ismail Yassine, Aziz Othman, Mahmoud Shokoko, and Elias Moadab.

Songs
Most of the film's songs feature lyrics by Hussein Al-Sayed Al-Azab and music by Mohammed Abdel Wahab. The exception is the traditional muwashshah (a sonnet-like form), "ملا الكاسات وسقاني" (lit.: “Fill My Glass with Rain”).

External links
 El Cinema page
 El Film page

Bibliography
 Kassem, Mahmoud. موسوعة الأفلام الروائية في مصر والعالم العربي (“Arabic Movies Encyclopedia”), vol. 2. Cairo: General Egyptian Book Organization, 2006.

Egyptian romance films
1948 films